Tudor Petruș (2 October 1949 – 12 September 2017) was a Romanian fencer. He competed in the individual and team foil events at the 1976 and 1980 Summer Olympics.

References

1949 births
2017 deaths
Romanian male fencers
Romanian foil fencers
Olympic fencers of Romania
Fencers at the 1976 Summer Olympics
Fencers at the 1980 Summer Olympics
Sportspeople from Cluj-Napoca